Saccharina japonica is a marine species of the Phaeophyceae (brown algae) class, a type of kelp or seaweed, which is extensively cultivated on ropes  between the seas of China, Japan and Korea. It has the common name sweet kelp. It is widely eaten in East Asia. A commercially important species, S. japonica is also  called ma-konbu in Japanese, dasima in Korean and hǎidài in Chinese. Large harvests are produced by rope cultivation which is a simple method of growing seaweeds by attaching them to floating ropes in the ocean.

The species has been cultivated in China, Japan, Korea, Russia and France. It is one of the two most consumed species of kelp in China and Japan. Saccharina japonica is also used for the production of alginates, with China producing up to ten thousand tons of the product each year.

Consuming excessive S. japonica suppresses thyroid function.

Nomenclature 
The species was transferred to Saccharina in 2006. Three synonyms for this species name are Laminaria japonica (J. E. Areschoug 1851), its variety Laminaria japonica var. ochotensis (Miyabe & Okamura 1936) and Laminaria ochotensis (Miyabe 1902).

Cultivation 
With the development of cultivation technology, though over 90% of Japanese kombu is cultivated mostly in Hokkaidō, production can also be found as far as south of the Seto Inland Sea.

Culinary use

China 

In Chinese cuisine, sliced kelp is a common hors d'oeuvre which is often consumed with alcohol.

Korea 
In Korean cuisine, dasima is used to make broth, deep-fried into bugak or twigak (coated and uncoated fries), pickled in soy sauce as jangajji, and eaten raw as a sea vegetable for ssam (wraps).

It is also used to make dasima-cha (kelp tea).

Cheonsa-chae (kelp noodles) is made from the alginic acid from dasima.

One of Nongshim's instant noodle, the Korean original versions of Neoguri, contains one (or rarely more) big piece of dasima in every package. Odongtong Myon, Ottogi's copy of Neoguri, also has big piece of dasima in every package - Ottogi uses 2 dasimas since 2020.

See also
 Edible seaweed
 Kelp
 Kelp tea
 Seafood allergy
 Vitamin B12
 Laverbread

References

Citations

Sources 

 Davidson, Alan. Oxford Companion to Food (1999), "Kombu", p. 435. 
Culture of Kelp (Laminaria japonica) in China

External links

 Kombu seaweed encyclopedia

Algae of Korea
Flora of Eastern Asia
Flora of China
Laminariaceae
Marine biota of Asia
Edible seaweeds
Japanese condiments
Chinese condiments
Korean condiments
Japanese cuisine terms
Umami enhancers